In cryptography, Ladder-DES is a block cipher designed in 1994 by Terry Ritter. It is a 4-round Feistel cipher with a block size of 128 bits, using DES as the round function. It has no actual key schedule, so the total key size is 4×56=224 bits.

In 1997, Eli Biham found two forms of cryptanalysis for Ladder-DES that depend on the birthday paradox; the key is deduced from the presence or absence of collisions, plaintexts that give equal intermediate values in the encryption process. He presented both a chosen-plaintext attack and a known-plaintext attack; each uses about 236 plaintexts and 290 work, but the known-plaintext attack requires much more memory.

References
 
 

Broken block ciphers
Data Encryption Standard
Feistel ciphers